WSWG (channel 44) is a television station in Valdosta, Georgia, United States, affiliated with CBS. It is owned by Marquee Broadcasting alongside Cordele-licensed MyNetworkTV affiliate WSST-TV (channel 55). WSWG's offices are located on Pine Avenue in Albany, and its transmitter is located in unincorporated Cook County, northeast of Adel, Georgia. Master control and some internal operations are based at WSST's studios on 7th Street South in Cordele.

Although Valdosta is part of the Tallahassee, Florida, television market, which receives CBS programming from Thomasville, Georgia–licensed WCTV (channel 6), WSWG technically serves as the CBS affiliate for Albany, even though its over-the-air broadcasting radius just misses Albany itself. As a result, in order to increase its over-the-air reach to Albany, WSWG's primary channel is simulcast on digital subchannel WSST-TV 55.20 (WSWG's MeTV subchannel is simulcast on WSST-TV 55.2), and it also relies on cable for most of its viewership. WCTV's more powerful digital signal also reaches Albany. 

Channel 44 in Valdosta went on the air in 1980 as ABC affiliate WVGA. It operated as a small station with limited local programming from December 1980 to February 1992. During this time, it was off the air in late 1988 and early 1989 after a small airplane crashed into its tower. The station was rebuilt but had very limited local programming. WTXL-TV, the ABC affiliate in Tallahassee, ran the station for seven months but ultimately withdrew from its attempt to buy it, after which time it was off the air for three years.

Hutchens Communications rebuilt the station as WB affiliate WGVP in 1995, changing to UPN in 1997. Gray Television acquired it in 2005, combined its operations with WCTV under the call sign WSWG, and then repurposed it the next year as a semi-satellite of WCTV for the Albany area. This continued until 2019, when Gray purchased Raycom Media and was forced to sell WSWG to remain under ownership limits in the market. It was then purchased by Marquee Broadcasting.

History

WVGA
Peachtree Telecasting, a consortium of out-of-state investors, applied to the Federal Communications Commission (FCC) in 1978 to build a new TV station in Valdosta. The permit was issued in April 1979, and Peachtree began meeting with the major television networks, seeking an affiliation. The group agreed to become the ABC for the Valdosta area; ABC's affiliate in Tallahassee, Florida, WECA-TV (now WTXL-TV), did not adequately cover the city. Peachtree Telecasting investors also included Hi Ho Broadcasting, owner of ABC affiliate WDHN in Dothan, Alabama.

Construction stretched through most of 1980: the station set up facilities on Norman Drive and erected a tower near Adel. The station began broadcasting on the evening of December 24. However, the station got off to a visibly bumpy start. It had presented a $16,000 check to the local chamber of commerce for office renovations in a goodwill gesture, but the check turned out to be bad; further, the studio-transmitter link was misaligned, leading to a degraded signal. Local programming slowly ramped up, first with commercial production and a local farm show before debuting evening newscasts. However, the station had a very difficult time obtaining national advertising, affecting its financial viability. Valdosta was served by WALB in Albany and WCTV in Thomasville, which drew higher ratings in the market.

Morris Network acquired WVGA and WDHN in 1986. Two years later, however, tragedy struck. On the morning of August 17, 1988, a dense fog spread over the region. Frank Blaydes, a doctor from Cairo, was piloting a Cessna 172 and had been diverted from Valdosta's airport to Adel. He never made it: after apparently mistaking the lights on the WVGA tower for the lights at the Adel airport, his aircraft struck the tower, causing the mast to collapse and the plane to crash, killing the pilot. Investigators determined that the pilot was not rated to land in such weather conditions and that no information was available to him about the weather at Adel.

The tower collapse was a blow to the station, which was out of service until January 1989 and lost considerable advertising revenue. Blaydes's parents initially sued Peachtree Telecasting for wrongful death compensation, claiming the station had been negligent in maintaining the tower. That lawsuit was dropped and replaced with one against Morris, to which the company responded with a countersuit. The matter proceeded to a jury trial in Chatham County in July 1991.

In February 1992, Morris Network reached a deal to sell WVGA to WTXL-TV owner ET Broadcasting. The limited local programming on the station—which had not aired local news in more than a year—was immediately replaced with a simulcast of WTXL-TV, also an ABC affiliate. The FCC granted permission for the two stations to be commonly owned in September, citing the fact that Morris had shopped the station to buyers since 1987 without success; company officials also note that national ratings services could not agree as to which market WVGA belonged. However, the sale was never consummated due to what were described as technical differences. When ET withdrew on November 6, 1992, the station lost its programming source and left the air.

WB and UPN
For the next two years, several groups looked at purchasing the station, which Morris threatened to dismantle. Gary Hutchens, a local business owner whose Welcome Channel broadcast local programming on the Valdosta cable system, mounted an effort to put the station back on the air, proposing initially to return it to the air as an ABC affiliate. His Hutchens Communications acquired the station for $1 million and announced in January 1994 that it would use its own studio facilities in conjunction with the Adel tower.

Hutchens reopened the station on October 28, 1995, as WGVP, an affiliate of The WB. However, the station's tower was the site of tragedy yet again on August 11, 1996, during a helicopter lift of the old antenna off the mast as part of its replacement. The helicopter clipped the tower and crashed into the forest; the pilot died instantly. 

WGVP switched to UPN on August 25, 1997. Even though it technically was the affiliate in the full market, its signal did not reach Tallahassee, leaving that city without UPN programming for more than a year until W17AB, later WVUP-LP, picked up the network as well in October 1998.

In 2001, the call letters were changed to WVAG. By 2003, Broadcasting & Cable considered the station to be the third television station in the Albany market, along with NBC affiliate WALB-TV and Fox affiliate WFXL. That year, after unsuccessful attempts to sell channel 44 to Venture Technologies Group in 1998 and Southern Nights Entertainment Corp. in 2000, control of Hutchens Communications shifted from Gary Hutchens and Robert Lee Hutchens Jr. to Paul Shok and Donald W. Meinke; the company was renamed Padon Communications, and then P.D. Communications.

P.D. Communications would sell WVAG to Gray Television for $3.75 million in 2005. Under Gray, the station was renamed WSWG and its operations were merged with those of WCTV. Gray had been the founder and original owner of rival WALB, but was forced to sell it after buying WCTV in 1996 because the FCC did not allow common ownership of stations with overlapping signals prior to 1999. WALB provides a city-grade signal to most of the Georgia side of the Tallahassee market; indeed, it had served as the default NBC affiliate for Tallahassee until that city got its own NBC affiliate, WTWC-TV.

CBS
On January 24, 2006, The WB and UPN announced the two networks would end broadcasting and merge to form The CW. On February 22, News Corporation announced that it would start up another new network called MyNetworkTV. Gray, which had earlier planned to add a second digital subchannel on WSWG to carry CBS while keeping UPN on analog, chose instead to broadcast CBS on the analog and main digital channels starting on September 4, 2006, as a semi-satellite of WCTV; the second subchannel then began to carry MyNetworkTV. The move created a strong combined signal with just under 50% overlap. WSWG simulcast most of WCTV's newscasts, and cleared most of its syndicated programming (though in some cases at different times). There were also some programs that only aired on WSWG while some are only seen on WCTV. WSWG also aired separate station identifications and commercials. Previously, WCTV had been the default CBS affiliate in Albany for many years.

On January 30, 2007, WSWG's analog signal on channel 44 went dark due to a damaged transmission line at the transmitter. Rather than incur the expense of restoring a signal that would only be temporary (analog broadcasting was due to end in the United States within two years), the station requested permission to surrender its analog license and broadcast only in digital on UHF channel 43. The FCC granted the request one year later. However, unlike its old analog signal on channel 44 (which operated at 1.7 million watts), digital channel 43 operated at only 50,000 watts (roughly equivalent to 250,000 watts for an analog transmitter) in order to protect Alabama Public Television station WGIQ in Louisville, Alabama. The lower-powered digital signal just misses Albany proper, which forces the station to rely on cable for most of its viewership. In contrast, WCTV's digital signal does reach Albany.

In early 2011, WSWG launched a third digital subchannel carrying The CW. Previously, programming from that network was seen exclusively on cable (with the fictional call sign "WBSK") via The CW Plus; the subchannel's programming was itself entirely derived from that service.

On August 16, 2018, Gray announced that it would sell WSWG to Marquee Broadcasting; the deal made it a sister station to WSST-TV (channel 22), an independent station that Marquee had earlier agreed to acquire. The sale was part of Gray's acquisition of Raycom Media, owner of WALB; Gray elected to keep WALB and sell WSWG. In April 2019, Marquee severed WSWG's ties to WCTV and moved MyNetworkTV from WSWG's second subchannel to WSST; a simulcast of WSST concurrently replaced CW Plus programming on WSWG's third subchannel, as Gray retained the CW affiliation and moved it to WGCW-LD and a WALB subchannel.

Newscasts
WSST-TV produces five hours of locally produced newscasts each week for WSWG (with only an hour each weekday). Unlike most CBS affiliates, WSWG does not carry newscasts on weekends, and the station airs paid programming on weekdays.

As a semi-satellite of WCTV, WSWG cleared most local newscasts from WCTV. WSWG did not produce any separate Southwest Georgia-specific segments during these newscasts; however, WCTV does operate news bureaus in Moultrie (co-located with WSWG's former sales office) and Valdosta on East Central Avenue/US 84/US 221. It formerly maintained another one in Thomasville (on North Broad Street; housed in the same building as a bureau still operated by WSWG's rival, WALB). WCTV's two reporters assigned to Southwest Georgia did not use any localized WSWG identification. Despite WSWG serving the Albany market, there was no actual news coverage of Albany itself provided by WCTV, though severe weather coverage for all of the Albany market was provided when conditions warranted (such as during a tornado warning). Through the simulcasting of WCTV's newscasts, WSWG the first station in Albany to offer local news in high definition when WCTV began producing high definition newscasts on August 3, 2009.

Following the sale to Marquee Broadcasting, WSWG dropped WCTV's newscasts on April 29, 2019. The station then launched local evening and late newscasts from studios in Albany; the news operation is shared with sister station WSST-TV.

Technical information

Subchannels
The station's digital signal is multiplexed. Despite WSWG once being a semi-satellite of WCTV, its two digital subchannels were programmed separately.

Analog-to-digital conversion
WSWG shut down its analog signal, over UHF channel 44, on January 30, 2007. This was over two years before the date of the federally-mandated transition from analog to digital broadcasts, which was originally February 17, 2009 (but was pushed back to June 12). The station's digital signal remained on its pre-transition UHF channel 43. Through the use of PSIP, digital television receivers display the station's virtual channel as its former UHF analog channel 44.

References

External links
 

SWG
CBS network affiliates
MyNetworkTV affiliates
MeTV affiliates
Ion Television affiliates
NewsNet affiliates
Start TV affiliates
Marquee Broadcasting
Television channels and stations established in 1980